Kosmoceras is a moderately evolute ammonite genus from the upper Callovian (Middle Jurassic) of Europe with a simple apterure and irregular ribbing interrupted by an irregular row of lateral tubercles. Strong ventral tubercles are separated by a smooth depression running along the rim.

Kosmoceras belongs to the Stephanoceratoidea and is the type genus for the Family Kosmoceratidae and for the subfamily Kosmoceratinae. Kosmoceras spinosum Waagen is the type species.

Lobokosmoceras and Gulielmiceras have been regarded as subgenera of Kosmoceras. Gulielmites is a fine-ribbed variety of Kosmoceras jason

Species
This genus includes more than 100 species, including:
 K. aculeatum
 K. balticum
 K. cromptoni
 K. bizeti
 K. fibuliferum
 K. geminatum
 K. gemmatum
 K. grossouvrei
 K. interpositum
 K. jason
 K. lithuanicum
 K. medea
 K. obductum
 K. ornatum
 K. phaeinum
 K. proniae
 K. rowlstonese
 K. spinosum
 K. subnodatum
 K. weigelti

Gallery

References

 Arkell et al., 1957. Mesozoic Ammonoidea. Treatise on Invertebrate Paleontology, Part L. Geological Soc. of America and Univ. Kansas Press.
 Fossils (Smithsonian Handbooks) by David Ward
 Kosmoceras in the Paleobiology Database
 Mikko's Phylogeny Archive Ammonoidea
 Sepkoski Online Results
 Philippe C. Courville, Catherine Crônier. Diversity or disparity in the Jurassic (Upper Callovian) genus Kosmoceras (Ammonitina): a morphometric approach

Middle Jurassic ammonites of Europe
Middle Jurassic genus first appearances
Ammonitida genera
Stephanoceratoidea